Berry Cemetery, also known as Holy Resurrection Cemetery, is a historic cemetery located near Ash Grove, Greene County, Missouri. It was established about 1875, and is a small, rural African-American cemetery.  It contains 48 marked graves dating from 1875 to 1948.  It may also contain Native American burials in three burial mounds.

It was listed on the National Register of Historic Places in 2004.

References

External links
 

African-American history of Missouri
Cemeteries on the National Register of Historic Places in Missouri
1875 establishments in Missouri
Buildings and structures in Greene County, Missouri
National Register of Historic Places in Greene County, Missouri
African-American cemeteries